General Charles Richard Fox (6 November 1796 – 13 April 1873) was a British army general, and later a politician.

Background

Fox was born at Brompton, the illegitimate son of Henry Richard Vassall-Fox, 3rd Baron Holland, through a liaison with Lady Webster, whom Lord Holland would later marry.

Career
After some service in the Royal Navy, Fox entered the Grenadiers, and was known in later life as a collector of Greek coins.  His collection was bought for the royal museum of Berlin when he died in 1873. He was present around the time of Napoleon's incarceration on St Helena and subsequently removed a key to the bedroom where Napoleon was lodged. This was given to his mother - Lady Holland - due to her Napoleonphile attitudes and auctioned in 2021. He married in St. George's, Hanover Square, London, on 19 June 1824 Lady Mary FitzClarence, a daughter of William IV by his mistress Dorothy Jordan.  The couple had no issue.

Fox was a politician. He represented the Whig interest and sat for Calne 1831–32, then Tavistock 1832–35. He briefly represented Stroud in 1835, but resigned that seat so Lord John Russell could contest it.  He was elected as a Member of Parliament for the east London constituency of Tower Hamlets in 1841 and served until 1847.

Fox was Surveyor-General of the Ordnance in 1841 and 1846–52. He was promoted Major-General on 9 November 1846, Lieutenant-General on 20 June 1854, and General on 6 March 1863.

References

Citations

Bibliography
 British Parliamentary Election Results 1832–1885, compiled and edited by F.W.S. Craig (The Macmillan Press 1977)
 The Parliaments of England by Henry Stooks Smith (1st edition published in three volumes 1844–50), second edition edited (in one volume) by F.W.S. Craig (Political Reference Publications 1973)
 Who's Who of British Members of Parliament: Volume I 1832–1885, edited by M. Stenton (The Harvester Press 1976)

External links 
 
 UK Parliamentary Archives, Letters from Charles Richard Fox to Lord John Russell

|-

1796 births
1873 deaths
British Army generals
Grenadier Guards officers
Liberal Party (UK) MPs for English constituencies
UK MPs 1831–1832
UK MPs 1832–1835
UK MPs 1835–1837
UK MPs 1841–1847
Burials at Kensal Green Cemetery
Charles Richard
Members of Parliament for Calne
Members of the Parliament of the United Kingdom for Tavistock